Colotis agoye, the speckled sulphur tip, is a butterfly of the family Pieridae. It is found in the Afrotropical realm.

The wingspan is 30–44 mm in males and 32–45 mm in females. The adults fly year-round in warm areas, peaking from March to June.

The larvae feed on Boscia and Cadaba species.

Subspecies
The following subspecies are recognised:
C. a. agoye (Mozambique, southern Zimbabwe, northern and eastern Botswana, northern Namibia South Africa)
C. a. bowkeri (Trimen, 1883) (south-western Botswana, southern Namibia, South Africa)
C. a. zephyrus (Marshall, 1897) (Ethiopia, Somalia)

References

Butterflies described in 1857
agoye